Scuticaria is a genus of moray eel in the family Muraenidae.

Species
 Scuticaria okinawae (D. S. Jordan & Snyder, 1901) (Shorttailed snake moray)
 Scuticaria tigrina (Lesson, 1828) (Tiger reef-eel)

References

 

Muraenidae

Taxa named by David Starr Jordan